MdeAS Architects (em/dee/ay/es), formerly Moed de Armas & Shannon Architects, is a New York-based architecture firm known for modern design focusing on the quality of natural materials, intelligent programming, and the redefining of Class A buildings, interiors, and public spaces. Founded in 1991, the award-winning studio is led by principals Dan Shannon, Raúl de Armas and Mike Zaborski.

History 
Partners Leon Moed and Raul de Armas founded the firm in 1991 after leaving their positions as senior partners at Skidmore, Owings & Merrill. Dan Shannon, an associate at SOM, joined Moed de Armas Architects at its founding. In 1997, he became a partner and the firm changed its name to Moed de Armas & Shannon. Mike Zaborski joined the firm in 1998 and became a partner in 2012. The firm officially changed its name to MdeAS Architects in October 2014. They have jointly completed 510 Madison Avenue, Gotham Center, the rejuvenation of the GM Building Plaza, and the redevelopments of 100 Park Avenue and 330 Madison Avenue. The firm also designed a glass spandrel system to replace the deteriorating marble façade of Canada's tallest building, First Canadian Place in Toronto.

The firm has a particular focus on facade replacements, public spaces and lobby renovations.

Completed projects 

 100 Park Avenue Redevelopment –  New York, New York, 2009 
 160 Fifth Avenue Redevelopment – New York, New York, 2009 
 200 Park Avenue Redevelopment – New York, New York, 2008 
 245 Park Avenue Lobby – New York, New York, 1996 
 300 Park Avenue Redevelopment – New York, New York, 2001 
 310 East 53rd Street – New York, New York, 2006 
 330 Madison Avenue Redevelopment – New York, New York, 2012 
 340 Madison Avenue Redevelopment– New York, New York, 2005 
 350 Madison Avenue Redevelopment – New York, New York, 2009 
 350 West Broadway – New York, New York, 2009 
 400 South Hope Street Lobby & Atrium – Los Angeles, California, 2011 
 430 Park Avenue Redevelopment – New York, New York, 2004 
 450 Park Avenue Lobby – New York, New York, 2004 
 485 Lexington Avenue Lobby – New York, New York, 2006 
 510 Madison Avenue – New York, New York, 2010 
 520 Madison Avenue Lobby – New York, New York, 2009
 540 Madison Avenue Retail Base and Lobby – New York, New York, 1997 
 545 Madison Avenue Redevelopment – New York, New York, 2009 
 575 Fifth Avenue Retail Base and Atrium – New York, New York, 2010 
 888 Seventh Avenue Lobby & Plaza – New York, New York, 2009 
 950 Third Avenue Lobby & Entry Pavilion – New York, New York, 2005 
 1095 Avenue of the Americas Redevelopment – New York, New York, 2008 
 The Grace Building Plaza – New York, New York, 2012 
 1120 Avenue of the Americas Redevelopment – New York, New York, 2007 
 1270 Avenue of the Americas Lobby – New York, New York, 2009
 1330 Avenue of the Americas Lobby – New York, New York, 2008 
 1350 Avenue of the Americas Lobby – New York, New York, 2008 
 1440 Broadway Lobby – New York, New York, 2001 
 1450 Broadway Base Recladding – New York, New York, 2002 
 1740 Broadway Lobby – New York, New York, 2005 
 Apollo Real Estate Advisors Offices – New York, New York, 1996-2002
 Children's Hospital @ Montefiore – Bronx, New York, 2001
 Joan and Sanford Weill Education Center, Cornell University Medical Center, New York, New York, 1998 
 First Canadian Place Recladding – Toronto, Ontario, 2012 
 Gotham Center – Long Island City, New York, 2010 
 Greene Medical Arts Pavilion @ Montefiore – Bronx, New York, 1994
 Tower 56 Lobby – New York, New York, 2011 
 Weill Cornell Medical College Master Plan – Education City, Qatar, 2004
 Main Airport Center Lobby – Frankfurt am Main, Germany, 2004
 Rockefeller Center Elevator Cabs – New York, New York, 2008-2010
 Credit Lyonnais Offices – New York, New York, 1991
 1325 G Street NW Lobby and Recladding – Washington, D.C., 2004
 101 West End Avenue, Park Hudson Building – New York, New York, 2001 
 525 West Monroe Street Lobby & Atrium – Chicago, Illinois, 2005
 757 Third Avenue Lobby & Storefronts – New York, New York, 2012

Projects under construction 

 First Canadian Place Podium, Concourse & Lobby – Toronto, Ontario, Fall 2012
 120 West 42nd Street – New York, New York, Winter 2012 
 1290 Avenue of the Americas Lobby – New York, New York, Spring 2013
 1330 Avenue of the Americas Plaza & Pre-built Offices – New York, New York, Fall 2012 
 The Town School Windmill Installation – New York, Fall 2012
 400 Park Avenue Window Replacement – New York, New York, Winter 2012
 1177 Avenue of the Americas Lobby – New York, New York, Spring 2013 
 527 Madison Avenue Lobby – New York, New York, Winter 2012 
 2 Grand Central Tower Plaza – New York, New York, Spring 2013 
 110 Fifth Ave. – New York, New York

References 

Architecture firms based in New York City
Design companies established in 1991
1991 establishments in New York City